Valérie Deseine is a French film editor who has worked on films including Me, Myself and Mum, Molière, Game of Four, Le Petit Nicolas, Asterix and Obelix: God Save Britannia, Nicholas on Holiday, Au nom de ma fille, Up for Love, and Fanny's Journey.

External links

French film editors
Year of birth missing (living people)
Place of birth missing (living people)
Living people
French women film editors